Phycitodes maritima is a species of snout moth. It is found in most of Europe (except Ireland, Lithuania, Ukraine and the western and southern part of the Balkan Peninsula. It may also be absent from the Iberian Peninsula).

Adults are on wing from April to May and from June to August. There are two generations per year.

The larvae feed on Achillea millefolium, Tanacetum vulgare and Senecio jacobaea. They initially live in the upper stem and leaf-axil of their host plant, later they are found on the flowers in a web. Larvae of the second generation hibernate in a cocoon. Pupation takes place in another cocoon.

References

Moths described in 1848
Phycitini
Moths of Europe